Yoav Potash is a writer and filmmaker whose works include the documentaries Crime After Crime and Food Stamped.

Movies
Potash produced and directed the film Crime After Crime, about the legal battle to free Deborah Peagler from a California prison. The film premiered at the 2011 Sundance Film Festival and went on to win dozens of awards in the US and abroad. Potash produced the documentary over a five and a half year span, an experience he wrote about for The Wall Street Journal. The film was broadcast on OWN, the Oprah Winfrey Network, as part of the OWN Documentary Club. The film was a New York Times Critics' Pick.

Potash's film Food Stamped documents the challenges of eating healthy on a food stamp budget. The film won the Jury Prize at the San Francisco Independent Film Festival and was nationally broadcast on Pivot, Participant Media's satellite and cable network. "Food Stamped" was also an official selection of Whole Foods Market’s online film festival,  Do Something Reel. and was featured on CNN Money.

In 2012, The Hollywood Reporter reported that Potash is currently working to adapt Crime After Crime into a dramatic major motion picture. In 2013, Potash's screenplay for that project ranked in the top 1% of over 3,000 dramatic scripts entered in the Austin Film Festival Screenplay Competition. That same year, Potash was selected to participate in the Film Independent Producing Lab to further develop the dramatic adaptation project.

In 2018, Potash was selected as a filmmaker-in-residence at the Jewish Film Institute in San Francisco to produce two documentary films on untold stories of the Holocaust, entitled The Remembered and Diary from the Ashes.

Writing
Potash earned a 2018 Simon Rockower Award for Excellence in Jewish Journalism from The American Jewish Press Association for his personal essay entitled "How I learned all Israelis are not my father," published by J, The Jewish News of Northern California. Potash has also written articles about his filmmaking experiences for publications including The Wall Street Journal  IndieWire, Videomaker, The Sundance Institute and TheWrap.

Personal life

Potash, Jewish, was raised by a Jewish, Israeli father and an American Jewish mother.

References

American documentary filmmakers
Living people
American Jews
Year of birth missing (living people)